Markus Gellhaus (born 9 June 1970) is a former German football player and manager . He is the currently assistant head coach club of Schalke 04.

Playing career
He played for SC Paderborn during his career.

Coaching career

Early career
He held several positions, including as an interim head coach and an assistant, during his time in SC Paderborn, before working together with Jos Luhukay as his assistant in Borussia Mönchengladbach, FC Augsburg and Hertha BSC.

SC Paderborn
He was appointed as the head coach on 13 June 2015, signing a two-year contract until 2017. He was sacked on 6 October 2015.

References

External links
 Profile at scoreway.com
 

1970 births
German footballers
German football managers
Living people
SC Paderborn 07 managers
2. Bundesliga managers
Association football midfielders